The All-National Basketball League Team was an annual National Basketball League (NBL) honor bestowed upon the best players in the United States league following the NBL season. The team was selected every season of the league's existence, from 1937–38 through 1948–49.

Nine players earned at least four total selections, three of whom have been inducted into the Naismith Memorial Basketball Hall of Fame – Bobby McDermott (1988), Buddy Jeannette (1994), and Al Cervi (1985).

Key

Annual selections

Most selections 
The following table only lists players with at least four total selections.

See also
All-NBA Team

References
General

Specific

National Basketball League (United States) awards
Awards established in 1938
1938 establishments in the United States